Coleophora fagicorticella is a moth of the family Coleophoridae. It is found in the United States, including Kentucky.

The larvae feed on the seeds of Juncus compactus. They create a tubular silken seed case.

References

fagicorticella
Moths described in 1874
Moths of North America